Kelly Harmani N'Mai (born 1 May 2004) is a Dutch footballer who plays as a midfielder for Chester on loan from  club Salford City. A product of Salford's academy, he made his senior debut in 2021.

Career
Born in Netherlands, N'Mai began playing football at an early age, and was scouted by Ajax. After moving to the United Kingdom with his family, he had trials for both Manchester United and Manchester City, before joining Salford City in 2020. N'Mai made his professional debut on 28 August 2021, coming on as an 85th minute substitute for Conor McAleny in Salford's 3–0 EFL League Two win against Newport County, their first win of the season. He started his first game for the club in an away fixture against Scunthorpe United in November, and signed his first professional contract the same month, a deal lasting until 2023.

On 29 September 2022, N'Mai joined Northern Premier League Premier Division club Warrington Rylands on an initial one-month loan deal. He scored his first goal for the club in a 2–1 defeat to Lancaster City on 11 October, and on 26 November scored a brace to secure a comeback victory against Stalybridge Celtic, coming on as a substitute to turn the game around for Rylands, securing the clubs' first away win in two months. In January 2023, N'Mai's loan was extended further. In March, N'Mai stepped up a division when he was loaned to National League North team Chester until the end of the season.

Career statistics

References

External links

2004 births
Living people
English footballers
Association football midfielders
Salford City F.C. academy graduates
Salford City F.C. players
Warrington Rylands 1906 F.C. players
English Football League players
Northern Premier League players